Diana Hall is a multifunctional Indoor arena in Yambol, Bulgaria. The arena was opened in 1964 and  has a seating capacity for 3,000 people. It is the home of BC Yambol. Besides basketball, local teams use the arena for practicing trampolining, boxing, wrestling, and range shooting . The arena has hosted many national and European tournaments, including the 2010 Bulgarian Basketball Cup, NBL all-star game 2015, the Strandzha Cup, and the international wrestling tournament Dan Kolov.

References

Indoor arenas in Bulgaria
Basketball venues in Bulgaria
Sports venues completed in 1964
1964 establishments in Bulgaria
Yambol